Radovna is a settlement in the Radovna Valley in the Municipality of Gorje in the Upper Carniola region of Slovenia.

On 29 September 1944 the entire hamlet of Srednja Radovna was burned to the ground by the German Army after a minor engagement with the Partisans in revenge for two of their numbers being taken and the locals' unwillingness to inform on the Partisans. Twenty-four villagers were killed and a memorial to the victims of this event has been erected in the valley.

References

External links
Radovna on Geopedia

Populated places in the Municipality of Gorje